Florent André (born 6 June 1991) is a French footballer who plays as a midfielder.

References 

1991 births
Living people
French footballers
Association football defenders
Ligue 2 players
Championnat National players
SC Bastia players
ASA 2013 Târgu Mureș players
Liga I players
ÉFC Fréjus Saint-Raphaël players
Expatriate footballers in Romania